Rwanda competed at the 2014 Summer Youth Olympics, in Nanjing, China from 16 August to 28 August 2014.

Athletics

Rwanda qualified four athletes.

Qualification Legend: Q=Final A (medal); qB=Final B (non-medal); qC=Final C (non-medal); qD=Final D (non-medal); qE=Final E (non-medal)

Boys
Track & road events

Girls
Track & road events

Beach Volleyball

Rwanda qualified a boys' and girls' team by their performance at the CAVB Qualification Tournament.

Cycling

Rwanda was given a girls' team to compete from the tripartite commission.

Team

Mixed Relay

Swimming

Rwanda qualified one swimmer.

Boys

References

2014 in Rwandan sport
Nations at the 2014 Summer Youth Olympics
Rwanda at the Youth Olympics